(January 4, 1882 – January 8, 1949) was a Japanese general in World War II and Chief of the Army General Staff during the final years of the conflict. He was convicted of war crimes and sentenced to life imprisonment.

Biography

Early life and career
Umezu was born in Nakatsu, Ōita, Japan, where his family ran a bookstore since the 18th century. During his years at the Kumamoto Prefectural Seiseikou High School in Kumamoto, he decided to pursue a military career. He graduated from the 15th class of the Imperial Japanese Army Academy on November 30, 1903 and was commissioned a second lieutenant in the infantry the following February 12, 1904. Promoted to lieutenant on June 30, 1905, he entered the 23rd class of the Army Staff College, graduating first in 1911. Following his promotion to captain on March 25, 1912, he was sent to Europe for further studies in Germany and Denmark. While in Denmark, he was also a military observer from Japan, during the course of World War I, and was promoted to major on June 1, 1918. From 1919 to 1921, he was appointed as a military attaché to Switzerland.

Umezu was promoted to lieutenant colonel on February 8, 1922, and to colonel on December 15, 1925. During the 1920s, he was a member of the Tōseiha, led by General Kazushige Ugaki along with Gen Sugiyama, Koiso Kuniaki, Tetsuzan Nagata and Hideki Tōjō. They represented a politically moderate line within the armed forces, in opposition to the radical Kōdōha movement, guided by Sadao Araki. Umezu served as an instructor at the Army Staff College from 1923–1924, and was commander of the IJA 3rd Infantry Regiment from 1924–1926.

Umezu was promoted to major general in August 1930 and commander of the  IJA 1st Infantry Brigade. He worked at the General Staff from August 1933, and was sent as a military attaché to Switzerland from November 1933. After his return to Japan in March 1934, he was appointed commander of the Japanese China Garrison Army and in November repelled a large-scale Chinese incursion into Rehe Province. In June 1935 he signed the He–Umezu Agreement, which was an attempt to defuse tensions between the Republic of China and Japan, and which gave Japan control over ten provinces of Hebei. Umezu  was promoted to lieutenant general in August. In August 1935, he became commander of the Sendai-based IJA 2nd Division. He strongly opposed the  February 26 incident attempted coup-de-etat in 1936. Umezu was appointed Vice Minister of War from March 1936 and working under Army Minister Terauchi Hisaichi, purged many of the radical kōdōha members from the Army ranks.

World War II

Umezu returned to China in May 1938 as commander-in-chief of the IJA 1st Army. By this time, the IJA 1st Army had completed its combat operations, and was serving as a garrison force in Japanese-occupied northern China. From September 1939 he was commander-in-chief of the Kwangtung Army, which was likewise acting as a garrison force in Manchukuo. He was promoted to full general on August 1, 1940.

In July 1944, Umezu was appointed as the final Chief of the Imperial Japanese Army General Staff, and a member of the Supreme War Council, following the resignation of Hideki Tojo. Along with Army Minister Korechika Anami and Chief of Imperial Japanese Navy General Staff,  Soemu Toyoda, Umezu opposed surrender in August 1945; he believed that the military should fight on, forcing the Allies to sustain such heavy losses in an invasion of Japan, that Japan could negotiate for peace under better terms. He was aware of the planned coup d'état by junior officers opposed to the surrender, but did nothing to either aid or hinder it. He was personally ordered by Emperor Hirohito to sign the instrument of surrender on behalf of the armed forces on September 2, 1945 and was thus the Army's senior representative during the surrender ceremonies on the battleship , officially ending World War II. He entered the reserves on November 30.

After the war, he was arrested by the SCAP authorities and tried as a war criminal at the International Military Tribunal for the Far East in Tokyo. He was found guilty of Counts 1, 27, 29, 31 and 32 of waging a war of aggression and sentenced to life imprisonment on November 12, 1948.

While in Sugamo Prison, he became a convert to Christianity. Umezu died from rectal cancer in 1949 while still incarcerated.

Decorations
 1906 –  Order of the Rising Sun, 6th class 
 1906 –  Order of the Golden Kite, 5th class 
 1913 –  Order of the Sacred Treasure, 5th class 
 1915 –  Order of the Rising Sun, 4th class 
 1922 –  Order of the Sacred Treasure, 3rd class 
 1933 –  Order of the Sacred Treasure, 2nd class 
 1936 –  Grand Cordon of the Order of the Sacred Treasure
 1939 –  Grand Cordon of the Order of the Rising Sun
 1940 –  Order of the Golden Kite, 2nd class

References

  Kase, Toshikazu (1950).  Journey to the Missouri.

Notes

External links 
USS Missouri

|-

1882 births
1949 deaths
People from Nakatsu, Ōita
Military personnel from Ōita Prefecture
Imperial Japanese Army generals of World War II
Japanese military personnel of World War II
Japanese military attachés
Japanese generals
Japanese colonial governors and administrators
Members of the Kwantung Army
People of the Kwantung Leased Territory
Japanese people convicted of war crimes
Japanese people convicted of the international crime of aggression
People convicted by the International Military Tribunal for the Far East
Japanese prisoners sentenced to life imprisonment
Prisoners sentenced to life imprisonment by international courts and tribunals
Japanese people who died in prison custody
Deaths from cancer in Japan
Deaths from colorectal cancer
Japanese Christians
Converts to Christianity
Grand Cordons of the Order of the Rising Sun
Recipients of the Order of the Sacred Treasure, 1st class
Recipients of the Order of the Golden Kite, 2nd class